Kameron Alexander McGusty (born September 9, 1997) is an American basketball player. He previously played for the Miami Hurricanes of the Atlantic Coast Conference (ACC), and the Oklahoma Sooners.

High school career
McGusty began his high school career at Seven Lakes High School in Katy, Texas. After starting on junior varsity his freshman year, he won district MVP on varsity as a sophomore. As a junior, he averaged 22 points per game. Wanting to play against better competition, McGusty transferred for his senior season to Sunrise Christian Academy in Kansas. A four-star recruit, McGusty committed to playing college basketball for Oklahoma in July 2015, choosing the Sooners over offers from Florida, Texas, Indiana, and Louisville, among others.

College career
As a freshman, McGusty averaged 10.9 points and 2.2 rebounds per game. He earned honorable mention All-Big 12 honors and was named to the Big 12 All-Newcomer team. McGusty's production declined to 8 points and 1.9 rebounds per game as a sophomore. In April 2018, he announced he was transferring to Miami.

McGusty averaged 12.5 points, 4 rebounds and 1.6 assists per game as a junior. As a senior, McGusty averaged 13.3 points, 3.8 rebounds and 2.8 assists per game. Following the season, he declared for the 2021 NBA draft, but ultimately withdrew to take advantage of a fifth season of eligibility granted due to the COVID-19 pandemic. On December 8, 2021, McGusty scored a career-high 29 points in a 76–59 victory against Lipscomb. On January 8, 2022, he had 14 points and hit the go-ahead layup with 20 seconds remaining in a 76–74 upset of second-ranked Duke. McGusty was named to the First Team All-ACC.

Career statistics

College

|-
| style="text-align:left;"| 2016–17
| style="text-align:left;"| Oklahoma
| 31 || 17 || 24.9 || .430 || .352 || .778 || 2.2 || .9 || .8 || .3 || 10.9
|-
| style="text-align:left;"| 2017–18
| style="text-align:left;"| Oklahoma
| 32 || 8 || 18.5 || .423 || .333 || .750 || 1.9 || .3 || .3 || .0 || 8.0
|-
| style="text-align:left;"| 2018–19
| style="text-align:left;"| Miami
| style="text-align:center;" colspan="11"|  Redshirt
|-
| style="text-align:left;"| 2019–20
| style="text-align:left;"| Miami
| 28 || 21 || 29.5 || .435 || .328 || .750 || 4.0 || 1.6 || .7 || .2 || 12.5
|-
| style="text-align:left;"| 2020–21
| style="text-align:left;"| Miami
| 20 || 18 || 33.3 || .445 || .320 || .821 || 3.8 || 2.8 || 1.3 || .1 || 13.3
|- class="sortbottom"
| style="text-align:center;" colspan="2"| Career
| 111 || 64 || 25.7 || .433 || .334 || .774 || 2.8 || 1.2 || .7 || .1 || 10.9

Personal life
McGusty is the son of Kerol McGusty and Julie Winn. His father played basketball at Stephen F. Austin for two seasons.

References

External links
Miami Hurricanes bio
Oklahoma Sooners bio

1997 births
Living people
American men's basketball players
Basketball players from Houston
Miami Hurricanes men's basketball players
Oklahoma Sooners men's basketball players
Shooting guards